Besart Veseli (born 24 September 1992 in Mitrovicë) is a Kosovar-Albanian footballer who plays for Vushtrria

Club career
Veseli joined KF Vëllaznimi in December 2015.

Suspension
In April 2019, Veseli was suspended for one year of playing football for ill-discipline after hitting and kicking a Fushë Kosova player who was lying on the ground.

References

1992 births
Living people
Sportspeople from Mitrovica, Kosovo
Kosovo Albanians
Association football midfielders
Kosovan footballers
KF Elbasani players
KF Vushtrria players
KF Vëllaznimi players
Kategoria Superiore players
Football Superleague of Kosovo players
Kosovan expatriate footballers
Kosovan expatriate sportspeople in Albania
Expatriate footballers in Albania